The Ethiopian Red Cross Society (ERCS) is a health facility in Ethiopia. It was founded and recognized by the ICRC in 1935. In 2002, it had 5.8 million fee paying adult members and about 200,000 volunteers.

Leadership
{{As of April 2018,  Abera Tola was president of ERCS and elected for 2nd term as president as of July, 2022

References

External links
 Official Site

Red Cross and Red Crescent national societies
1935 establishments in Ethiopia
Organizations established in 1935
Medical and health organisations based in Ethiopia